Kavindu Kulasekara (born 20 August 1995) is a Sri Lankan first-class cricketer. He was part of Sri Lanka's squad for the 2014 ICC Under-19 Cricket World Cup.

References

External links
 

1995 births
Living people
Sri Lankan cricketers
Kandy District cricketers
Cricketers from Colombo